This article lists the latest men's squads lists for badminton's 2020 European Men's and Women's Team Badminton Championships. Ranking stated are based on world ranking date for 21 January 2020 as per tournament's prospectus.

Group 1
Group 1 consists of Denmark, 
Wales, 
Latvia, 
and Switzerland.

Denmark

Wales

Latvia

Switzerland

Group 2
Group 2 consists of England, 
Estonia, 
Greenland, 
and Sweden.

England

Estonia

Greenland

Sweden

Group 3
Group 3 consists of France, 
Belgium, 
Hungary, 
and Turkey.

France

Belgium

Hungary

Turkey

Group 4
Group 4 consists of Russia, 
Austria, 
Ireland, 
and Poland.

Russia

Austria

Ireland

Poland

Group 5
Group 5 consists of Germany, 
Azerbaijan, 
Czech Republic, 
and Iceland.

Germany

Azerbaijan

Czech Republic

Iceland

Group 6
Group 6 consists of Netherlands, 
Lithuania, 
Luxembourg, 
and Slovakia.

Netherlands

Lithuania

Luxembourg

Slovakia

Group 7
Group 7 consists of Finland, 
Norway, 
Portugal, 
Slovenia, 
and Ukraine.

Finland

Norway

Portugal

Slovenia

Ukraine

Group 8
Group 8 consists of Spain, 
Bulgaria, 
Croatia, 
Israel, 
and Italy.

Spain

Bulgaria

Croatia

Israel

Italy

References

2020 European Men's and Women's Team Badminton Championships